The Main Street Historic District encompasses the historic commercial center of Middletown, Connecticut, United States.  Middletown was one of the most important ports on the Connecticut River during the colonial period, and Main Street "has been the center of community life since the earliest period of settlement". Today Main Street is home to a number of 19th century buildings, maintaining the bulk of its historic character.  It was listed on the National Register of Historic Places in 1983.

Properties included
The district extends along Main Street from St. John's Square (junction with Spring Street) in the north, for five blocks on the west side (to College Street) and 4-1/2 blocks on the right (midway between Washington and Court Streets), abutting the Metro South Historic District on the west side, and modern buildings on the right.

According to the National Register of Historic Places (NRHP) nomination for the district, two properties in the district—the Church of the Holy Trinity and the Old Middletown Post Office are already on the NRHP in their own right. Three other individual properties were determined to be for NRHP status in their own right: the Arthur Magill, Jr. House/Chase School at 631 Main Street, the Main Street Firehouse at 533 Main Street, and the North End Meeting House at 710-712 Main Street. More generally, the entire block on the east side of Main Street from Washington to Ferry Streets, and numbers 560-614 from Ferry to Green were determined to be eligible.

Contributing properties
Contributing properties according to the 1983 nomination for the district:
 225 Main Street, Farmers & Mechanics Savings Bank, 1920
 237-45 Main Street, Nehemiah Hubbard House, before 1788, major Greek Revival style remodeling. (No longer extant 2012: 225 Main Street has an annex on this site.)
 267 Main Street, Connecticut Bank and Trust, 1920, Renaissance Revival (Prior to use by CBT, was Middletown National Bank)
 291 Main Street, Old Post Office, 1916, Renaissance Revival
 315 Main Street, Middletown Savings Bank, 1928, Academic Classicism
 319-323 Main Street, Old Banking House Block, 1796 - south section; 1815 - north section
 335 Main Street, Guy & Rice Building, 1930, Renaissance Revival
 339-351 Main Street, Commercial Building, 1892, originally erected as YMCA
 354 Main Street, The Capitol Theater, 1925, Neo-Classical Revival
 357-359 Main Street, Hubbard-Holland Building, 1873 
 360 Main Street, Pythian Building, ca. 1874, remodeled 1938, Renaissance Revival detail
 363 Main Street, Central National Bank Building, 1915, Renaissance Revival detail, remodelled 1980
 366-386 Main Street, James H. Bunce Company, ca. 1920, early Modern Commercial
 381 Main Street, The Church of the Holy Trinity, 1871–1874, Gothic Revival, Henry Dudley architect
 388-392 Main Street, Wrubel Building, early 20th century, contemporary marble facing over Art Deco facade (now Main Street Market)
 393 Main Street, City Savings Bank, ca. 1915, Colonial Revival
 412-416 Main Street, R.W. Camp Company, 1920, Renaissance Revival
 418-420 Main Street, Sheldon Building, 1866, mid-19th century Commercial
 422-426 Main Street, Pagan's Block, 1868, Victorian Italianate
 437 Main Street, Commercial Building, early 20th century commercial
 428-432 Main Street, Woolworth Building, 1939, Commercial Art Deco
 438-440 Main Street, Washington Building, 1915, early 20th century Commercial
 62-70 Washington Street, Stueck's Modern Tavern, 1914, Renaissance Revival
 460 Main Street, Steuck's Block, 1893, Late 19th century Commercial
 472 Main Street, Penny Press Building; Alsop-King Building, 1873–4, Commercial Italianate
 476-478 Main Street, Pagan's New Block, 1912, Early Modern Commercial with Classical Revival detail
 484-494 Main Street, Caulkins & Post Building, 1889–1890, Commercial
 489-493 Main Street, Caulkin's Buick-Cadillac, 1905, Early 20th century Commercial
 501-507 Main Street, St. Aloysius Building, 1894, with 1916 Georgian Revival remodeling; a.k.a. St. Aloysius Society Building; collapsed 2 February 2011
 502-508 Main Street, Ward-Cody Building, 1880, Victorian Commercial, Birthplace of Major General Maurice Rose
 512-522 Main Street, J. Poliner & Sons, 1925, Colonial Revival
 533 Main Street, Central Fire Station, 1899, Renaissance Revival Fire Station
 530-540 Main Street, Palmer Building, 1900, Early 20th century Commercial
 542-544 Main Street, Southmayd's Building, 1872, Victorian Commercial with Classical detail
 546-548 Main Street, J. Poliner & Sons Shoe Store, 1833, 19th century Commercial
 560-564 Main Street, Lawton & Wall Block, 1867, Italianate Commercial unbroken common cornice with 566-576 Main Street and identical facade.
 566 Main Street, Lawton & Wall Block, 1870-1874
 574-576 Main Street, Lawton & Wall Block, 1870–1874, Italianate Commercial
 578-582 Main Street, 1894, Late 19th century Commercial
 584-588 Main Street, Shlien's Furniture, 1897, Commercial Italianate
 598-614 Main Street, Hotchkiss Block, Late 19th century Commercial
 9-11 Liberty Street, Mission Chapel, 1853, Greek Revival
 601-607 Main Street, Hotel Arrigoni, 1914, Colonial Revival
 613-617 Main Street, Scranton Building, 1876, Commercial Italianate
 630-636 Main Street, Spencer-Annenberg Block, 1897, 19th century Commercial
 625-631 Main Street, Arthur Magill, Jr. House-Chase School, 1821, Federal-Greek Revival
 635 Main Street, 1920, Early 20th century Commercial
 642-644 Main Street, Murphy's Drug Store, 1895, Commercial
 648-654 Main Street, Spencer Annenberg Block, 1870, addition 1911
 656-664 Main Street, 1898, Commercial
 666 Main Street, Stow Block, 1893, Commercial
 682-686 Main Street, Kabatznick Building, 1922, modern commercial with classical details
 695-699 Main Street, early 20th century Commercial
 696-700 Main Street, Applequest Block, 1898, Commercial Victorian
 710-712 Main Street, Fourth Meeting House of the First Church of Christ, Scientist, 1799, Federal style church
 716-724 Main Street, Early 20th century Commercial (no longer extant 2012)
 738 Main Street, O'Rourke's Diner, Early 20th century, erected on current site in 1947; Diner, Art Deco detail
 Hartford Avenue, Riverview Cemetery, 1650–1850, dating from earliest settlement; much of it destroyed ca. 1950 for highway construction.
 St. John's Street, St. John's Cemetery, 1850–present, from earliest settlement of Irish immigrants; behind St. John's Roman Catholic Church. Notable for the extensive biographical information on the headstones, including birthplace in Ireland, family members and cause of death.
 5 St. John's Street, St. John's Parochial School, 1887, Victorian Institutional
 9 St. John's Street, St. John's Roman Catholic Church, 1852, spire-1864, Gothic Revival
 19 St. John's Street, St. John's Rectory, 1864, Second Empire
 33 St. John's Street, Catholic Charities Building, 1872, Victorian Institutional
 King's Avenue, Trolley Barn, 1894, Late 19th century Industrial

There are also 10 non-contributing properties in the district.

Pictures

See also
National Register of Historic Places listings in Middletown, Connecticut

References

External links

Middletown Downtown Business District

Middletown, Connecticut
Historic districts in Middlesex County, Connecticut
National Register of Historic Places in Middlesex County, Connecticut
Historic districts on the National Register of Historic Places in Connecticut